The Burundi national basketball team represents Burundi in international competitions. It is administrated by the Fédération de Basketball du Burundi.

Burundi joined FIBA in 1994 and is one of its youngest members. Unlike its neighbors DR Congo, Rwanda and Tanzania, the team has not yet succeeded to qualify for the FIBA Africa Championship.

Current roster
Team for the 2013 Afrobasket Qualification:

Competitions

Performance at Summer Olympics
yet to qualify

Performance at World Championships
yet to qualify

Performance at FIBA Africa Championship
yet to qualify

References

External links
 Burundi Basketball Records at FIBA Archive
 Africabasket - Burundi Men National Team
 Presentation on Facebook

Men's national basketball teams
Basketball
Basketball in Burundi
1994 establishments in Burundi
Basketball teams in Burundi